Carex pediformis is a species of sedge (genus Carex), native to Eurasia, from Eastern Europe to Korea. It is a forest-steppe specialist.

Subtaxa
The following varieties are currently accepted:
Carex pediformis var. macroura (Meinsh.) Kük.
Carex pediformis var. pediformis
Carex pediformis var. pedunculata Maxim.
Carex pediformis var. setifolia Kük.

References

pediformis
Plants described in 1831